The Surface Duo 2 is a dual-touchscreen Android smartphone manufactured by Microsoft. Announced during a hardware-oriented event on September 22, 2021, it is the successor to the original Surface Duo.

Specifications

Hardware 
The Surface Duo 2 uses a similar folio form factor to the first-generation model, although it is slightly thicker to accommodate a larger battery, and now offered in a new white color option. It features a pair of 5.8-inch OLED displays with a 90 Hz refresh rate, with their innermost edges being curved over the side. This is used as part of a new feature known as the "Glance Bar", which allows notifications and other content to be displayed along its spine. As with the Surface Duo, it supports Surface Pen styluses, including the concurrently-unveiled Surface Slim Pen 2.

The device uses the Qualcomm Snapdragon 888 5G system-on-chip, adding 5G and near-field communication (NFC) support that was not present on the original Surface Duo. It also has an increased, 8 GB of RAM, dual speakers, and a fingerprint reader in its power button.

The Surface Duo 2 has both front and rear-facing cameras, with the rear camera featuring a 12-megapixel lens, 16-megapixel wide-angle lens, and a 12-megapixel telephoto lens.

Software 
The Surface Duo 2 launched with Android 11. An update to Android 12 L was released in October 2022, adding Windows 11-inspired design elements and other new features.

Reception 
The Verge was mixed; it praised the Duo 2 for having more competitive hardware than the first-generation model, including a faster processor, more RAM, and 5G support (although still lacking features such as wireless charging), and its software for being "undeniably better than it was on the original at launch". However, the reviewer noted issues with touch input response, web browsers such as Microsoft Edge and Google Chrome did not support displaying multiple pages on the two screens, and felt that its cameras were exceeded in quality by even cheaper devices such as the Pixel 5a.  In conclusion, it was felt that "between the bugs and inherent awkwardness of the form factor, the Duo 2 is just a difficult device to live with day to day, much like its predecessor."

Timeline

References 

Dual screen phone
Microsoft Surface
Products introduced in 2021